Cornufer adiastolus is a species of frog in the family Ceratobatrachidae, endemic to New Britain Island in Papua New Guinea.

Original description

References

adiastolus
Amphibians described in 2006
Frogs of Asia
Endemic fauna of New Guinea